Ivana Lovrić (born 1 September 1984) is a retired Croatian team handball player. She was played in the Croatian national team, and participated at the 2011 World Women's Handball Championship in Brazil and the 2012 Summer Olympics in London.

Fatal car accident
On 28.October 2012 Ivana Lovrić was involved in a car accident. Police report states: 28-year-old Ivana Lovrić driver of Opel Corsa in Zagreb's Dankovecka Street ran into a 33-year-old woman crossing the road at a pedestrian crossing at the intersection with Svetojakobska Street. The report also said that the woman was thrown away on the westbound lane while the Ivana Lovrić continued driving without stopping, without providing the pedestrian with adequate assistance or notifying ambulance and police officers. Later findings found that Ivana Lovric, who committed the accident in the early morning hours, was under the influence of alcohol. Zagreb Municipal Criminal Court (OKS ZG) found Ivan Lovric guilty and sentenced him to 1 year and 6 months imprisonment BUT the sentence was converted into a suspended sentence in such a way that the sentence of imprisonment would not be enforced if the accused did not commit a new criminal offense within 5 years of the verdict becoming final.

References

External links

1984 births
Living people
Croatian female handball players
Olympic handball players of Croatia
Handball players at the 2012 Summer Olympics
Croatian expatriate sportspeople in France
Handball players from Zagreb